Limestone Run may refer to:

Limestone Run (Montour and Northumberland Counties, Pennsylvania)
Limestone Run (North Branch Potomac River)
Limestone Run (Union County, Pennsylvania)